Mycron was a pioneer manufacturer of microcomputers, located in Oslo, Norway.

Originally named Norsk Data Industri, the company was founded in 1975 by Lars Monrad Krohn, who was also one of the founding fathers of Norsk Data. Among the employees are Arne Maus (1986–89) and Gisle Hannemyr.
The company was renamed MySoft in 1999.

Computers manufactured by Mycron
MYCRO-1 was an Intel 8080 machine, running the MYCROPoperating system. Afterwards the Mycron 3 was developed, running CP/M. The Mycron 1000 featured a Zilog Z80 processor and ran MP/M. Finally the Mycron 2000 was released, based on an Intel 8086 CPU, running CP/M-86 and MP/M-86 operating systems.

References

External links
Computer-Archiv - Mycron
Mycron image collection

Computer companies of Norway
Defunct companies of Norway
Defunct computer hardware companies
Computer companies established in 1975
1975 establishments in Norway